Fritillaria dajinensis is an Asian species of herbaceous plant in the lily family, native to Sichuan Province in China.

Fritillaria dajinensis is a bulb-forming perennial up to 50 cm tall. Flowers are nodding (hanging downward), greenish yellow, with purple spots.

References

dajinensis
Flora of Sichuan
Plants described in 1983